The Governor of Zaporozhye Oblast is the head of government of Zaporozhye Oblast, a de facto federal subject of Russia, considered by the United Nations as part of Ukraine.

The Governor is elected by direct popular vote for a term of five years and can hold the position for two consecutive terms.

List of officeholders

References 

Zaporozhye